Varmenjeh is a village in Miyan Darband Rural District, in the Central District of Kermanshah County, Kermanshah Province, Iran. At the 2006 census, its population was 821, in 195 families.

References 

Populated places in Kermanshah County